Stefan Pfeiffer (born 15 November 1965 in Hamburg) is a former freestyle swimmer from Germany. At the 1984 Summer Olympics in Los Angeles he won the bronze medal in the 1500 m freestyle event. Four years later at the 1988 Summer Olympics in Seoul, Pfeiffer earned another medal, this time silver, in the same event.

References
Profile

1965 births
Olympic silver medalists for West Germany
Olympic bronze medalists for West Germany
German male swimmers
Living people
Swimmers at the 1984 Summer Olympics
Swimmers at the 1988 Summer Olympics
Swimmers at the 1992 Summer Olympics
Olympic swimmers of West Germany
Olympic swimmers of Germany
Sportspeople from Hamburg
Olympic bronze medalists in swimming
German male freestyle swimmers
World Aquatics Championships medalists in swimming
European Aquatics Championships medalists in swimming
Medalists at the 1988 Summer Olympics
Medalists at the 1984 Summer Olympics
Olympic silver medalists in swimming
20th-century German people
21st-century German people